Science Fiction is the fifth and final studio album by American rock band Brand New, released on August 17, 2017  through Procrastinate! Music Traitors. It was the band's first album in eight years, following Daisy in 2009. 

After several weeks of speculation, hints and leaks, the album was surprise-released digitally with its title and track listing previously unknown. Physical editions of Science Fiction came out on October 20, 2017. It was both a critical and commercial success, being met with universal acclaim from music publications and becoming Brand New's first and only number one album on the Billboard 200 chart in the United States.

Background
Following the release of their fourth studio album, Daisy, in 2009, Brand New took time away from writing new music. In July 2014, the band confirmed that they had entered the studio to begin the recording process for the new album. However, they did not officially release any new material until a single entitled "Mene" in 2015, a discarded song from The Devil and God Are Raging Inside Me. Another new song, "Sealed to Me", was also premiered in concert. This was later followed by the release of another single, "I Am a Nightmare", in 2016. Additionally, the band officially released the batch of leaked demos from the Devil and God recording session, as well as an EP consisting of three demos reworked. During that time period, Brand New hinted several times through concerts and merchandise that the band would be breaking up in 2018. The band initially prepared to release their fifth album in 2016; however, they postponed the release in September 2016 after expressing dissatisfaction with the final product.

As with Daisy, the lyrics on the album were divided amongst both Accardi and Lacey.

Release
On August 15, 2017, Brand New updated the website for their record label, Procrastinate! Music Traitors, allowing for pre-orders of a confirmed fifth album to be shipped in October on vinyl format in a limited quantity. A tour of the Eastern United States and the UK was announced as well.

On August 17, a CD containing one 61-minute long track was shipped to people who had pre-ordered the limited edition vinyl, with each CD numbered out of 500. The track, entitled "44.5902N104.7146W" (coordinates to the Devils Tower National Monument in Wyoming, also known as the setting for the 1977 sci-fi film Close Encounters of the Third Kind) came with a booklet including quotes from the Poole versus HAL 9000 chess match scene in the 1968 sci-fi film 2001: A Space Odyssey. The track was livestreamed by a fan through a Facebook group, where the album title Science Fiction, artwork, and certain track titles such as "No Control", "Desert", "Out of Mana", "In the Water" and "451", were revealed using the music identification app Shazam. Later that day, the band made the album available for pre-order in vinyl, CD and digital download formats for release in October. The physical edition of the album was released on October 20, 2017. Vinyl pre-orders, including white and blue and red variants, were delayed due to pressing issues with the record label Procrastinate! Music Traitors.

Artwork
The cover is based around a photograph by Swedish artist Thobias Fäldt. The photograph features two women, Malin and Emma, seemingly jumping from a window. The packaging for the release has been created by Brooklyn based studio Morning Breath, Inc., who also worked on the artwork for Daisy and "Mene".

Critical reception

Science Fiction received widespread critical acclaim. At Metacritic, which assigns a normalized rating out of 100 to reviews from mainstream critics, the album received an average score of 88, indicating "universal acclaim." Awarding the album a "Best New Music" designation, Pitchforks Ian Cohen praised Science Fiction as "a wise and vulnerable conclusion for a rock band who were crucial in shaping a scene, a sound, and many emotions." "Same Logic/Teeth" was awarded "Best New Track". Zoe Camp of Spin called it a "nostalgia-steeped, emotionally draining record" which makes for "a worthy (if bittersweet) send-off to one of the most brutally honest, forward-thinking rock bands of the new millennium." Michelle Geslani of Consequence of Sound noted familiar themes of "morality, truth and authenticity, religion as an institution, and mental health issues", while concluding that "on Science Fiction Lacey sounds more resigned to his fate than ever before." Chris Payne of Billboard felt that the album establishes Brand New as "part of a lineage of constantly-shape-shifting, steadfastly fascinating experimental rock bands." In Uproxx, Steven Hyden labeled Science Fiction as the "emo Abbey Road", while Emma Garland of Vice called it "a fitting ending" to the band's career. Sputnikmusic stated that Science Fiction "obliterates already unreasonably high expectations while forming one of the best and most anticipated curtain-calls in recent memory."

Accolades

Commercial performance
Science Fiction debuted at number one on the US Billboard 200 in the issue dated September 9, 2017, with 58,000 album-equivalent units. Of that tally, the album sold 55,000 traditional album copies. Science Fiction marked the first number one album of Brand New's career, topping their previous high of Daisys number six debut in 2009. Additionally, it became the first independently released album to top the charts since Frank Ocean's Blonde in 2016. The fourteen-year gap between Brand New's first charting album, Deja Entendu in 2003, and their first number one album in 2017, is the longest since David Bowie's 43-year gap from 1973 to 2016. Science Fiction also debuted at number one on Billboards Independent Albums chart. It was also the first independently-released album to reach number one in 2017.

In its second week, Science Fiction fell to No. 97, setting a new record for the steepest fall from number one in the history of the Billboard 200 chart. By the next week, the album fell off the chart completely; with two weeks, Science Fiction was the shortest lasting number one album in Billboard history. However, the album re-entered at No. 50 in October after its physical release.

The track "Can't Get It Out" was promoted to alternative radio stations and listed as the "Artist's Pick" on Spotify. It earned airplay from stations including Los Angeles' KROQ.

Track listing
All music written by Brand New. Lyrics written by Accardi and Lacey.

Note: The initial track listing was one long track entitled "44.5902N104.7146W", which are the approximate coordinates for Devils Tower.

Personnel 

Brand New
 Jesse Lacey – vocals, rhythm guitar
 Vincent Accardi – lead guitar, vocals
 Garrett Tierney – bass, vocals
 Brian Lane – drums
Production
 Mike Sapone - producer, audio engineer, mixer
 Vince Ratti - mixing
 Mike Sapone - mixing ("Same Logic/Teeth")
 Charles Godrey - audio engineer
 Steve Kupillas - audio engineer
 Claudius Mittendorfer - audio engineer
 Gerardo "Jerry" Ordonez - audio engineer
 Brett Romnes - audio engineer
 Joe Cannetti - assistant audio engineer
 Zachary Casper - assistant audio engineer
 Amanda Giacomo - assistant audio engineer
 Nathan Kiner - assistant audio engineer
 Mario Ramirez - assistant audio engineer
 Emily Lazar - mastering
 Chris Allgood - mastering assistant
Additional Performances by:
 Michael Gagliardi – horns on track 5
 Andrew Accardi - synthesizer on track 6
 Frank LaTorre - harmonica on track 8
 Mike DiMeo - hammond organ on track 8
 Santino Sapone - ambient synthesizer apparatus

Charts

Weekly charts

Year-end charts

Release history

See also
List of Billboard 200 number-one albums of 2017

References

2017 albums
Procrastinate! Music Traitors albums
Albums produced by Mike Sapone
Brand New (band) albums
Albums recorded at Sonic Ranch